On 30 January 1969, the Beatles performed an impromptu concert from the rooftop of their Apple Corps headquarters at 3 Savile Row, in central London's office and fashion district. Joined by guest keyboardist Billy Preston, the band played a 42-minute set before the Metropolitan Police arrived and ordered them to reduce the volume. It was the final public performance of their career.

Although the concert had been conceived only a few days previously, the Beatles had been planning to return to live performance since they began the recording sessions for their album Let It Be (1970). They performed nine takes of five new songs as crowds of onlookers, many on lunch breaks, congregated in the streets and on the rooftops of nearby buildings to listen. The concert ended with "Get Back", with John Lennon joking, "I'd like to say thank you on behalf of the group and ourselves, and I hope we've passed the audition."

The entire performance was filmed and recorded, and footage was used in the 1970 documentary film Let It Be and the 2021 documentary series The Beatles: Get Back. The first performance of "I've Got a Feeling" and single takes of "One After 909" and "Dig a Pony" were also featured on the accompanying album. On 28 January 2022, the audio of the full rooftop performance was released to streaming services under the title Get Back – The Rooftop Performance.

In February 2022, Disney released the entire concert sequence as presented in The Beatles: Get Back in IMAX as The Beatles: Get Back – The Rooftop Concert. It had a limited theatrical engagement to critical acclaim.

Background
Although the rooftop concert was unannounced, the original intention behind the Beatles' Get Back project had been for the band to stage a comeback as live performers. The idea of a large public show was sidelined, however, as one of George Harrison's conditions for returning to the group after he had walked out of the filmed rehearsals on 10 January. Another of Harrison's stipulations was that they move from Twickenham Film Studios to their Apple Corps headquarters and record their new songs in the Apple Studio in the basement. On 22 January, Harrison brought in keyboardist Billy Preston as an additional musician, in the hope that a talented outsider would encourage the band to be tight and focused.

Paul McCartney and Michael Lindsay-Hogg, the director of the project, continued to hope that the Beatles would end the recording sessions with a live performance in front of an audience. According to Beatles historian Mark Lewisohn, it is uncertain who thought of a rooftop concert, but the idea was conceived just days before the actual event. In Preston's recollection, it was John Lennon who suggested it.

In his autobiography Sound Man, audio engineer Glyn Johns said the idea for the concert was his. He recalled that it originated from a lunchtime discussion, when Ringo Starr mentioned that there was a great view of London's West End from the roof and took Johns and Lindsay-Hogg up to see it. Mal Evans, the Beatles' road manager, recorded in his diary that the idea came about "after we'd taken a breath of fresh air on the roof after lunch" on 26 January. Peter Jackson's documentary series The Beatles: Get Back shows Johns and Lindsay-Hogg presenting McCartney with the idea and McCartney being excited about it.

Starr was initially determined not to play, and Harrison was reluctant. The 29 January audio tapes for Lindsay-Hogg's production capture McCartney pleading with Lennon that a live performance was essential to maintain the Beatles' connection with their audience, and the band members merely needed to overcome their stage fright. In a group discussion at the end of that day, Harrison talked enthusiastically about the upcoming show for the first time and joked about performing for an audience of chimneys. Consistent with a decision he made during the Twickenham rehearsals, however, Harrison declined to have any of his songs included in the set.

Preparation
Evans organised the building of a stage on the Apple rooftop and the setting up of the band's equipment. The instruments used during the performance were Lennon's stripped-back Epiphone Casino, McCartney's signature Höfner "violin" bass, Harrison's new, custom-made rosewood Fender Telecaster, and Starr's recently acquired Ludwig drum kit, plus a Fender Rhodes electric piano for Preston. Johns and assistant engineer Alan Parsons purchased women's stockings from a local Marks & Spencer store to protect the microphones from the winter wind. Plans to hire a helicopter to capture aerial footage were abandoned.

The audio was recorded on two eight-track recorders in the basement studio at Apple by Johns and Parsons. Lindsay-Hogg's crew used six cameras to film several angles of the performance. In addition to cameras located on the rooftop with the band, one camera was placed, without permission, on the roof of a building across the street; a camera was hidden behind a two-way mirror in the reception area of the building, ready to capture any disruption caused by the loud music; and two cameras were on the street to film interviews and reactions from passers-by.

Performance

Until the last minute, according to Lindsay-Hogg, the Beatles were still undecided about performing the concert. He recalled that they had discussed it and then gone silent, until "John said in the silence, 'Fuck it – let's go do it.'"

The four Beatles and Preston arrived on the roof at around 12:30pm. When they started playing, there was confusion nearby among members of the public, many of whom were on their lunch break. As the news of the event spread, crowds began to congregate in the streets and on the flat rooftops of nearby buildings. While most responded positively to the concert, the Metropolitan Police grew concerned about noise and traffic issues, having received complaints from several local businesses. The film cameras captured police officers arriving at Apple to stop the performance. Apple employees initially kept the officers in reception and refused to let them up to the roof, but reconsidered when threatened with arrest.

According to Johns, the band fully expected to be interrupted by the police, since there was a police station not far along Savile Row. The authorities' intervention satisfied a suggestion made by McCartney earlier in January, that the Beatles should perform their concert "in a place we're not allowed to do it ... like we should trespass, go in, set up and then get moved ... Getting forcibly ejected, still trying to play your numbers, and the police lifting you."

The officers ascended to the roof just as the Beatles began the second take of "Don't Let Me Down". During the next number – the final version of "Get Back" – McCartney improvised the lyrics to reflect the situation: "You've been playing on the roofs again, and that's no good, 'cause you know your Mummy doesn't like that ... she gets angry ... she's gonna have you arrested!" Acting on the police officers' instructions, Evans turned off Lennon and Harrison's guitar amplifiers mid-song, only for Harrison to turn his amplifier back on in defiance. Evans then turned Lennon's back on as the band continued to play.

The concert came to an end with the conclusion of "Get Back". McCartney said "Thanks Mo", in response to applause and cheers from Maureen Starkey, Starr's wife. Lennon then said: "I'd like to say thank you on behalf of the group and ourselves, and I hope we've passed the audition."

Set list 

The rooftop concert consisted of nine complete takes of five Beatles songs: three takes of "Get Back"; two each of "Don't Let Me Down" and "I've Got a Feeling"; and one take each of "One After 909" and "Dig a Pony". On 28 January 2022, the audio of the full rooftop performance was released in Dolby Atmos to streaming services as Get Back – The Rooftop Performance. The album version reproduced the set list in its performance order. As seen in the 2021 Disney+ documentary series The Beatles: Get Back, a short take of "Get Back" was also played and filmed before takes one and two, as part of the preliminary sound check. The concert also includes a short take of the British national anthem "God Save the Queen". Track times are taken from the streaming version released in 2022.

All tracks are written by John Lennon and Paul McCartney, except where noted:

"Get Back" (Take 1)4:43
"Get Back" (Take 2)3:24
"Don't Let Me Down" (Take 1)3:22
"I've Got a Feeling" (Take 1)4:44
"One After 909"3:09
"Dig a Pony"5:52
"God Save the Queen" (Traditional, arranged by Lennon, McCartney, Harrison, and Starkey)0:26
"I've Got a Feeling" (Take 2)5:35
"Don't Let Me Down" (Take 2)3:30
"Get Back" (Take 3)3:47

The first performance of "I've Got a Feeling" and the recordings of "One After 909" and "Dig a Pony" were later used for the album Let It Be. In 1996, the third live performance of "Get Back", which was the last song of the Beatles' final live performance, was included on Anthology 3. An edit of the two takes of "Don't Let Me Down" was included on Let It Be... Naked,  as was a composite of the two takes of "I've Got a Feeling". There were also brief jams of "I Want You (She's So Heavy)" (after the first "Get Back") and "God Save the Queen" (after "Dig a Pony") while Parsons changed tapes. Lennon sang lines from "Danny Boy" and "A Pretty Girl Is Like a Melody" between some of the songs.

Legacy 
The Beatles' rooftop concert marked the end of an era for many fans. The group recorded one more album, Abbey Road, for which work started the following month, but in September 1969 Lennon left the band. At the time, many observers believed that the concert was a trial run for a return to live performances and touring, with the band re-engaging with their rock 'n' roll roots. The concert footage provided the climax of Lindsay-Hogg's documentary, originally planned as a TV special but released as the Let It Be film in May 1970, a month after the Beatles' break-up.

According to author James Perone, the concert achieved "iconic status" – both among fans, as the Beatles' final live appearance, and in the history of rock music, on the level of the Monterey Pop, Woodstock and Altamont festivals. He said that, although the show was "not technically a 'concert'" because of the secrecy surrounding its presentation, and because the band's last official concert was on 29 August 1966 in San Francisco, it stood out for capturing the sort of unpredictability that became typical of live rock performances in 1969.

The Rutles' "Get Up and Go" sequence in the 1978 film All You Need Is Cash mimics the footage of the rooftop concert, and uses similar camera angles. In January 2009, tribute band the Bootleg Beatles attempted to stage a 40th anniversary concert in the same location, but were refused permission by Westminster City Council because of licensing problems.

In The Simpsons 1993 fifth season episode "Homer's Barbershop Quartet", the Be Sharps (Homer, Apu, Barney and Principal Skinner) perform a rendition of one of their previous hits, "Baby on Board", on the rooftop of Moe's Tavern. George Harrison, who guest-starred in the episode, is shown saying dismissively, "It's been done!" As the song ends and the credits begin, Homer repeats John Lennon's phrase about passing the audition and everyone laughs, including Barney until he says, "I don't get it."

In the 2007 film Across The Universe, a musical made up entirely of Beatles' music, Sadie's band performs a rooftop concert in New York City which mimics the original. It is interrupted and closed down by the New York Police Department.

The music video for Kazuyoshi Saito's 2010 song "Zutto Suki Datta" faithfully recreates the rooftop performance of "Get Back" with Saito as McCartney, Lily Franky as Lennon, Hiroyuki Kobori as Harrison, and Gaku Hamada as Starr. It won Best Male Video at the 2011 Space Shower Music Video Awards.

U2 made homage to The Beatles and this concert in their video for "Where the Streets Have No Name", which featured a similar rooftop concert in Los Angeles, 1987.

Manchester indie band James performed a similar rooftop gig on the twenty-second anniversary of the Beatles' version (30 January 1991) on top of the Piccadilly hotel. The band performed five songs, before having to end the set reputedly because Larry Gott's fingers had become frozen to his fretboard.

McCartney played a surprise mini-concert in midtown Manhattan from the top of the marquee of the Ed Sullivan Theater on 15 July 2009, where he was recording a performance for the Late Show with David Letterman. News of the event spread via Twitter and word of mouth, and nearby street corners were closed off to accommodate fans for the set.

Personnel 
The Beatles
 John Lennon – lead and backing vocals, rhythm guitar; lead guitar on "Get Back"
 Paul McCartney – lead and backing vocals, bass guitar
 George Harrison – backing vocals, lead guitar; rhythm guitar on "Get Back"
 Ringo Starr – drums

Additional musician
 Billy Preston – electric piano

See also
 List of the Beatles' live performances

References

Sources

External links 
 Don't Let Me Down from the rooftop
 Former Apple executive Ken Mansfield's recollections of the concert

History of the Beatles
Rooftop Concert
1969 in British music
1969 in London
Concerts in the United Kingdom
January 1969 events in the United Kingdom
1960s in the City of Westminster
The Beatles live albums